Nandrolone cyclohexanecarboxylate (brand names Nor-Durandron, Norlongandron; former developmental code name NSC-3351), or nandrolone hexahydrobenzoate, also known as 19-nortestosterone 17β-cyclohexanecarboxylate, is a synthetic androgen and anabolic steroid and a nandrolone ester that has been marketed by Ferring Pharmaceuticals since at least 1961.

See also
 List of androgen esters § Nandrolone esters

References

Androgens and anabolic steroids
Cyclohexyl compounds
Nandrolone esters
Prodrugs
Progestogens